Chiossone is a surname. Notable people with the surname include:

Edoardo Chiossone (1833–1898), Italian engraver and painter
Tulio Chiossone (1905–2001), Venezuelan historian, writer, jurist and criminal lawyer, humanist, scholar, judge, legislator, politician, scholar, and writer